George C. Eads (born August 20, 1942) is an American economist. He served on the Council of Economic Advisers from 1979 to 1981. He later served as vice president of CRA International.

A native of Clarksville, Texas, Eads earned a degree in economics from University of Colorado Boulder, before continuing his postgraduate studies at Yale University.

References 

1942 births
Living people
People from Clarksville, Texas
University of Colorado Boulder alumni
Yale University alumni
United States Council of Economic Advisers
Economists from Texas
21st-century American economists